Joseph Gabriel Jean-Paul "Johnny" Denis (February 28, 1924 – January 3, 1989) was a professional ice hockey player who played ten games in the National Hockey League. Born in Montreal, Quebec, he played with the New York Rangers.

References 

1924 births
1989 deaths
Canadian ice hockey right wingers
New York Rangers players
New York Rovers players
Ice hockey people from Montreal
Canadian expatriate ice hockey players in the United States